NahooToo is the second album by Scottish musician Paul Mounsey.

Track listing
 "Remembrance" (5:27)
 "Wherever You Go" (5:04)
 "North" (5:44)
 "Infinite Contempt" (5:05)
 "Another Clearance" (4:57)
 "Kaiwa Farewell" (5:02)
 "Psalm" (1:41)
 "Turned On the Dog" (2:38)
 "Nahoo" (5:59)
 "The Fields of Robert John" (4:30)
 "Fall" (4:03)
 "A Mhairead Og (Pt. 1)" (1:07)
 "A Mhairead Og (Pt. 2)" (4:18)
 "Red River" (3:14)
 "Hope You're Not Guilty" (4:41)
 "Nahoo Reprise" (3:55)
 "Lullaby" (3:06)

Song uses
North was used in VisitScotland TV adverts from 2002-2011.
Fall is used in countdowns broadcast by the TV channel BBC Alba.

References 

1997 albums
Paul Mounsey albums